Sounds Like Teen Spirit (also known as Sounds Like Teen Spirit: A Popumentary) is a 2008 documentary and debut feature film of Bafta-Award nominated director Jamie Jay Johnson.

It was shown at the Toronto International Film Festival 2008 and was premiered in Ghent, Belgium and Limassol, Cyprus where the 2008 Junior Eurovision Song Contest was held.

Plot
It follows the lives of the participants of the Junior Eurovision Song Contest 2007, specifically the entrants from Belgium, Bulgaria, Cyprus and Georgia. The film sees them proceed from the national finals that saw them crowned the representatives of their country through to the international song festival itself held in Rotterdam, the Netherlands, where they each compete against 16 other acts.

Critical reception
The film was exceptionally well received by critics receiving an 87% 'fresh' rating on Rotten Tomatoes. Director Johnson was praised for his 'crowdpleasing' debut and his success in getting the participants to 'open-up' on camera.

In the 2009 Dinard British Film Festival in Brittany, France 'Sounds Like Teen Spirit' played in competition and won the prestigious 'Hitchcock D’Argent' Audience Award.

In the Seattle International film festival 2009 the film won a Special Jury Award and was highly commended by the jury "for excellence in capturing the universal experience of young adults discovering their place in the world".

Sounds Like Teen Spirit was also nominated for a British Independent Film Award in the 'Best Documentary' category.

References

External links
 Director's website
 Sounds Like Teen Spirit at BFI
 Sounds Like Teen Spirit at British Council–Film
 Sounds Like Teen Spirit at Lumiere

2008 films
Documentary films about singers
Films about competitions
Junior Eurovision Song Contest
Films produced by Elizabeth Karlsen
Number 9 Films films
British documentary films
2000s English-language films
2000s British films